Deblina Chatterjee is an Indian film and television actress.

Career
She started her career in the performing industry in 2010, after being cast as Aadu in the Bengali feature Ami Aadu (2011), marking her film and acting debut. The movie was directed by Somnath Gupta and was screened at the 2011 IFFI (International Film Festival of India). It went on to win the 58th National Film Award for the Best Feature Film in Bengali.

In 2012, she made her television debut in the Star Plus show Sajda Tere Pyaar Mein as Aaliya Hassan.  She also played Gayatri (Gayu) in Yeh Rishta Kya Kehlata Hai on Star Plus from December 2018 to May 2019 and quit the show as she doesn't want to age.

Television

Filmography

References

21st-century Indian actresses
Indian film actresses
Indian television actresses
Living people
Actresses from Kolkata
Actresses in Bengali cinema
Indian soap opera actresses
Actresses in Hindi television
Year of birth missing (living people)